Ralph Albert Foote (January 22, 1923 – July 16, 2003) was an American attorney who served as the 69th lieutenant governor of Vermont from 1961 to 1965, and a prominent attorney practicing in Middlebury, Vermont.

Early life
Foote was born in Proctor, Vermont, on January 22, 1923. He was the grandson of Lieutenant Governor Abram W. Foote.

Foote graduated from Amherst College in 1943 and served in the United States Marine Corps during World War II, including combat at the Battle of Okinawa. He graduated from Albany Law School in 1949 and became an attorney in Middlebury.  He returned to active duty with the Marines during the Korean War.

Career
A Republican, Foote served as Deputy State's Attorney of Addison County and interim state's attorney. He was an unsuccessful candidate for the Republican state's attorney nomination in 1950.  Foote ran successfully for the Vermont House of Representatives in 1956 and served two terms, also serving as chairman of the House Judiciary Committee.

Elected Lieutenant Governor in 1960, he served under Republican F. Ray Keyser Jr.  When Keyser lost the governorship to Philip H. Hoff in 1962, Foote won re-election. In 1964 Foote challenged Hoff, but lost badly in what turned into a wave election for Democrats nationwide.

Foote spent the rest of his career at the law firm of Conley and Foote in Middlebury.  He also served as president of the Addison County and Vermont Bar Associations, was chairman of the Vermont Judicial Conduct Board, and chaired the Middlebury and Addison County Republican Committees.

Personal life
He was married for more than 50 years to Nancy Dickey Foote.  They had five sons—Brian, Peter, Cory, Richard, and Anthony.

Death
He died in Middlebury on July 16, 2003.  He was cremated, and his remains were interred at Evergreen Cemetery in West Cornwall, Vermont. His wife Nancy died on May 10, 2014.

References

1923 births
2003 deaths
Lieutenant Governors of Vermont
Republican Party members of the Vermont House of Representatives
Military personnel from Vermont
People from Middlebury, Vermont
Amherst College alumni
Albany Law School alumni
United States Marine Corps personnel of World War II
United States Marine Corps personnel of the Korean War
United States Marines
Vermont lawyers
State's attorneys in Vermont
Burials in Vermont
20th-century American politicians
20th-century American lawyers